The Great Canadian Culture Hunt was a Canadian documentary television miniseries which aired on CBC Television in 1976.

Premise
Canadian culture was featured in this series of documentaries hosted by actor Gordon Pinsent.

Scheduling
This hour-long series was broadcast Wednesdays from 10 March to 14 April 1976. The first three episodes were broadcast at 8:30 p.m. after which the episodes began at 8:00 p.m.

Episodes

 10 March 1976, "Politics and Culture" (Dave Robertson producer) – featured opinions from Greg Curnoe, Yvon Deschamps, Hugh Faulkner (then Secretary of State), Herschel Hardin, Peter C. Newman (Maclean's), Lise Payette, Hamilton Southam (then the National Arts Centre director) and Peter Swann (Royal Ontario Museum director).
 17 March 1976, "Home Movies" (Bob Ennis producer) – concerned the national film industry and the often inconsistent support from both the private and public sectors
 24 March 1976, "The Music Industry" (Robert Patchell producer) – Bruce Cockburn, Murray McLauchlan and Anne Murray were interviewed
 31 March 1976, "The Publishing Industry" (Jesse Nishihata producer) – featured Margaret Atwood, Robert Kroetsch, Irving Layton, Michael Ondaatje and Audrey Thomas
 7 April 1976, "Theatre" (Allan King producer) – featured writers Carol Bolt, David Freeman, David French, Michel Garneau, Michel Tremblay, and directors Bill Glassco, Martin Kinch and Paul Thompson.
 14 April 1976, "The Television Industry" (Larry Gosnell producer) -
The final program dealt with television, and centred on the research and
opinions of U.S. scholar George Gerbner, dean on the Annenberg School of
Communications.

References

External links
 
 

CBC Television original programming
1976 Canadian television series debuts
1976 Canadian television series endings
1970s Canadian documentary television series